John Bibby (19 February 1775 – 17 July 1840) was the founder of the British Bibby Line shipping company.  He was born in Eccleston, near Ormskirk, Lancashire. He was murdered on 17 July 1840 on his way home from dinner at a friend's house in Kirkdale.

References

Further reading
 (lengthy biography)

1775 births
1840 deaths
Businesspeople from Liverpool